The following is a partial list of notable NYU Tandon School of Engineering alumni, and current and former faculty. Also see List of New York University alumni.

Notable faculty

Stephen Arnold
Boris Aronov, Sloan Research Fellow
Dan Bailey – fly-shop owner, innovative fly developer and staunch Western conservationist
Barouh Berkovits - invented the cardiac defibrillator and artificial cardiac pacemaker.
Maureen Braziel
George Bugliarello - Chairman of the Board of Science and Technology for International Development of the National Academy of Sciences; of the National Medal of Technology Nomination Evaluation Committee; and of the National Academy of Engineering Council's International Affairs Committee
Charles Camarda
Justin Cappos - Professor in the department of Computer Science and Engineering; data-security software developer
Ju-Chin Chu – Chemical engineer and father of Steven Chu. He became an Academia Sinica member in 1964.
Francis Crick – co-discoverer of DNA structure; awarded Nobel Prize for Physiology or Medicine
Paul M. Doty – emeritus Harvard Mallinckrodt Professor of Biochemistry; specialized in the physical properties of macromolecules; involved in peace and security policy issues
R. Luke DuBois – composer, performer, conceptual new media artist, programmer, record producer, pedagogue
Paul Peter Ewald – inventor of X-ray diffraction method for determination of molecular structure; Physics Department chair until 1957
Leopold B. Felsen
Antonio Ferri - leader of a team that created the first practical hypersonic tunnel heater, used to heat air for discharge into a wind tunnel.
R. M. Foster – Bell Labs mathematician whose work was of significance regarding electronic filters for use on telephone lines.
Herbert Freeman
Siddharth Garg - cybersecurity researcher, associate professor
Eugene D. Genovese – historian of the American South and slavery
Gordon Gould – former Polytechnic professor; inventor of the laser
David and Gregory Chudnovsky – mathematicians who held the record for number of digits of pi in 1989; now run the Institute for Mathematics and Advanced Supercomputing at Polytechnic
Leslie Greengard
S. L. Greitzer – mathematician; founding chairman of the US Mathematical Olympiad;  publisher of the pre-college mathematics journal Arbelos
Charles William Hanko – historian and politician
David Harker – physicist; X-ray crystallographer; discoverer of the Donnay-Harker law and Harker-Kasper inequalities
Paul Horn
Jerry MacArthur Hultin
Katherine Isbister
Myles Jackson
Andrew Kalotay
Maurice Karnaugh – inventor of Karnaugh Maps (K-Maps) while at Bell Labs; professor at the Westchester campus 1980-1999; retired
Edward Kimbark – power engineer
Parke Kolbe
Joseph Wood Krutch – writer, critic, and naturalist
Erich E. Kunhardt
Yann LeCun
Paul Levinson – author of The Plot To Save Socrates; media commentator on The O'Reilly Factor; Visiting Professor at the Philosophy and Technology Study Center at Polytechnic, 1987–1988
Frederick B. Llewellyn – electrical engineer
Erwin Lutwak - mathematician
Rudolph Marcus – former Polytechnic professor; Nobel Prize in chemistry; National Medal of Science winner.
Nathan Marcuvitz – electrical engineering pioneer
Herman F. Mark – founder of the Polymer Research Institute; National Medal of Science winner.
Phil Maymin - Assistant Professor of Finance and Risk Engineering; Libertarian Party House candidate in Connecticut
Warren L. McCabe - American chemical engineer and is considered as one of the founding fathers of the profession of chemical engineering
David Miller
Elliott Waters Montroll – scientist and mathematician
Samuel Morse – co-inventor of the Morse code; contributor to the invention of a single-wire telegraph system based on European telegraphs
J. H. Mulligan, Jr. – namesake of IEEE James H. Mulligan, Jr. Education Medal
Tsuneo Nakahara
Donald Othmer – co-author of Kirk-Othmer Encyclopedia of Chemical Technology; inventor of the Othmer Still, a laboratory device for vapor-liquid equilibrium measurements
Charles G. Overberger
Athanasios Papoulis – pioneer in the field of stochastic processes
Leonard Peikoff – former philosophy professor; founder of the Ayn Rand Institute
David J. Pine
John R. Ragazzini
Theodore Rappaport
John Howard Raymond
Hans Reissner – German aeronautical engineer
Keith W. Ross - Computer science professor
Murray Rothbard – former economics professor; key figure in libertarian movement
Michael Shelley – Professor of Mechanical Engineering
Samuel Sheldon - IEEE president.
Joshua W. Sill – Professor of Mathematics; became the youngest General in the Civil War; namesake of Fort Sill
Aleksandra Smiljanić
Joel B. Snyder - IEEE president
K. R. Sreenivasan
Torsten Suel – pioneer of search engine algorithms
Jerome Swartz - developed early optical strategies for barcode scanning technologies
Nassim Nicholas Taleb – epistemologist author of The Black Swan; works in the risk engineering department
James Tenney – composer; music theorist
John G. Truxal
Ernst Weber – founder of the Microwave Research Institute; first IEEE President; National Medal of Science winner.
Jack Keil Wolf – researcher in information theory and coding theory; Guggenheim fellow
Ta-You Wu – nuclear physicist; President of Academia Sinica
Dante C. Youla – namesake of Youla–Kucera parametrization in control theory
Louis Zukofsky – second-generation American modernist poet
David Lefer
Robert Ubell
Beth Simone Noveck

Notable alumni

See also 
List of New York University alumni
List of New York University faculty
List of university and college mergers in the United States

References

Lists of people by university or college in New York City

New York University-related lists